Ahmed Al-Fraidi (born 29 January 1988 in Medina) is a Saudi football plays for Costa Brava as a midfielder.

Career
At the age of 17, he joined the Riyadh based club Al-Hilal, where he played as number 8 on a midfielder position.

Career statistics

 Assists

International career
He is the youngest player to join the Saudi national team and was chosen to play at the World Cup Qualification in 2010.

International goals

Scores and results list  Saudi Arabia's goal tally first.

Honours

Club
Al-Hilal
Saudi Premier League : 2007–08, 2009–10, 2010–11
Crown Prince Cup : 2007–08, 2008–09, 2009–10, 2010–11, 2011–12

Al-Nassr
Saudi Premier League : 2014–15

References

1988 births
Living people
Saudi Arabian footballers
Saudi Arabian expatriate footballers
Al-Ansar FC (Medina) players
Al Hilal SFC players
Ittihad FC players
Al Nassr FC players
UD Melilla footballers
Al-Qadsiah FC players
UE Costa Brava players
Saudi Professional League players
Segunda División B players
Saudi Arabian expatriate sportspeople in Spain
Expatriate footballers in Spain
Association football midfielders